Statistics of Copenhagen Football Championship in the 1911 season.

Baneklubberne Tournaments
featuring clubs that owned their playing ground

KBU League (official)
featuring clubs without own playing ground

References
Denmark - List of final tables (RSSSF)

1
1
Top level Danish football league seasons
Copenhagen Football Championship seasons
Denmark
Denmark